David Gascón Cordero (born 11 April 1978 in Madrid), known as Copito, is a Spanish footballer who plays as a striker.

External links

1978 births
Living people
Footballers from Madrid
Spanish footballers
Association football forwards
Segunda División players
Segunda División B players
Tercera División players
CP Mérida footballers
CP Cacereño players
Benidorm CF footballers
Getafe CF footballers
AD Alcorcón footballers
CD Torrevieja players
Real Balompédica Linense footballers
Motril CF players
CF Villanovense players
Mérida UD footballers
CD Badajoz players